The Bloch MB.300 Pacifique (a.k.a. La Grosse Julie, "Big Julie") was a French all-metal three-engine monoplane that was developed to enter service as an Air France airliner. Though a single prototype was produced by Société des Avions Marcel Bloch in 1935, it was eventually rejected by Air France circa 1938.

Design and development
Test flight happened on November 15 or November 16, 1935 at the Villacoublay airfield with test pilots André Curvale and Jean Lapeyr. The prototype (F-AONB) went under a serie of modifications in early 1936 then again in March 1937. Passengers number was then reduced from 30 to 24.

It officially entered in service with the Air France fleet in January 1938 (as F-AOUI). Its fate is unknown, but it was reportedly delivered to Spain.

Specifications

See also

Notes

References

External links

 Official archives at DassaultAviation.com
 Bloch MB-300 sur AviaFrance.com
 Nouki.ch

1930s French airliners
MB.300
Trimotors
Low-wing aircraft
Aircraft first flown in 1935